Paracnuella is a  Gram-negative, rod-shaped and motile genus of bacteria from the family of Chitinophagaceae with one known species (Paracnuella aquatica). Paracnuella aquatica has been isolated from water from a thermal spring in China.

References

Chitinophagia
Bacteria genera
Monotypic bacteria genera
Taxa described in 2019